Tom Heinemann (born April 23, 1987) is an American former professional soccer player who is currently head coach for the United States U15 team.

Career

Youth and college 

Heinemann attended Christian Brothers College High School, and played college soccer at Rockhurst University from 2006 to 2008, where he was named to the NSCAA/adidas NCAA Division II Men's All-America Team as a sophomore and as a junior. During his time at Rockhurst, Heinemann accumulated 36 goals and 21 assists while appearing in 60 games.  He also played in the USL Premier Development League for St. Louis Lions, where he was a prolific goalscorer, netting 35 times in 36 games over three seasons with the team.

Professional 

Heinemann was signed to his first professional contract by the Charleston Battery after impressing head coach Michael Anhaeuser during a pre-season trial. He made his professional debut on April 11, 2009, in Charleston's USL1 season opener against the Vancouver Whitecaps and scored his first professional goal on June 7, 2009, in a 1–1 tie with the Austin Aztex.

Heinemann continued with Charleston in 2010, helping them to the 2010 USL Second Division title. Following the conclusion of the 2010 USL2 season, Heinemann signed with the Carolina RailHawks for the remainder of the USSF Division 2 Professional League regular season and playoffs. Heinemann scored the game-winning goal in the RailHawks semifinal victory over the Montreal Impact. During that season, the Railhawks made a run to the title match, but lost to the Puerto Rico Islanders. He was named MVP of the championship game.

On January 6, 2011, Heinemann signed with Columbus Crew of Major League Soccer. He played his first game with the Crew on March 19, 2011 in their 2011 MLS season opener against D.C. United. Heinemann was released by Columbus following the 2012 season and signed with Vancouver Whitecaps FC on January 23, 2013 scoring his first MLS goal for the team on September 1, 2013 in second-half stoppage time, to help his team draw 2–2 with Chivas USA. The club declined his option along with seven other players at the end of the 2013 season.

He was signed by NASL expansion side Ottawa Fury on February 2, 2014 ahead of their inaugural campaign.

Heinemann signed with Tampa Bay Rowdies on December 14, 2015.

Heinemann signed with new NASL club San Francisco Deltas on February 6, 2017. The club won the post-season playoffs for the league but folded shortly after due to financial difficulties.

Heinemann signed with USL club FC Cincinnati on December 5, 2017. However, he was released by the club before the 2018 season started due to a failed entry physical.

On March 29, 2018, Heinemann signed with Penn FC of the United Soccer League.

Coaching 

Heinemann retired from professional soccer following the 2018 season. On April 16, 2019, he was named an assistant coach with the Belmont Bruins men's soccer team.

In February 2022, Heinemann was named head coach for the United States boys' national under-15 soccer team.

Personal 

Heinemann is the owner and director of the Heinemann Soccer Camp in St. Louis, Missouri.

References

External links 

 
 Belmont athletics bio

1987 births
Living people
American soccer players
American expatriate soccer players
St. Louis Lions players
Charleston Battery players
Penn FC players
North Carolina FC players
Columbus Crew players
Vancouver Whitecaps FC players
Ottawa Fury FC players
Tampa Bay Rowdies players
San Francisco Deltas players
Soccer players from Missouri
Expatriate soccer players in Canada
USL League Two players
USL First Division players
USL Second Division players
USSF Division 2 Professional League players
American expatriate sportspeople in Canada
North American Soccer League players
Association football forwards
American soccer coaches
Belmont Bruins men's soccer